A shaft passer is a hypothetical device that allows a spoked wheel to rotate despite having a shaft (such as the axle of another wheel) passing between its spokes. The device is usually mentioned as a joke between nerds, in the manner of a fool's errand, since there is no evidence of one ever having been constructed until very recently.

One of the earliest printed references to these devices was made by Richard Feynman, who was told by a colleague at Frankford Arsenal in Philadelphia that the cable-passing version of the device had been used during both world wars on German naval mine mooring cables, to prevent the mines from being caught by British cables swept along the sea bottom.

The device was supposed to work using a spoked, rimless wheel that allows cables to pass through as it rotates. The ends of the spokes are widened, and the cable is held together by a short curved sleeve through which these spoke ends slide.

External links
 , with diagram of the device.

References

Fringe physics
Practical jokes